Didia subramosella is a species of snout moth in the genus Didia. It was described by Ragonot, in 1893. It is found in South Africa.

References

Endemic moths of South Africa
Moths described in 1893
Phycitini